The Brazilian Handball Confederation is the governing body of handball in Brazil, established in 1979. The president is Manoel Luiz Oliveira. It organises the Liga Nacional de Handebol; it also runs the Brazil national teams for men and women and organises the Four Nations Tournament friendly competition.

Champions of the Liga Nacional

Men's Tournament
1997  Metodista São Bernardo
1998  Metodista São Bernardo
1999  Metodista São Bernardo
2000  Metodista São Bernardo
2001  Metodista São Bernardo
2002  Metodista São Bernardo
2003  Imes São Caetano
2004 Metodista São Bernardo
2005  Unifil Londrina
2006  Metodista São Bernardo
2007  EC Pinheiros
2008  Unopar Paraná
2009  EC Pinheiros
2010  EC Pinheiros
2011  EC Pinheiros
2012  EC Pinheiros
2013  Handebol Taubaté
2014  Handebol Taubaté
2015  EC Pinheiros
2016  Handebol Taubaté
2017  EC Pinheiros
2018  EC Pinheiros
2019  Handebol Taubaté

Women's Tournament
1997  AA Guarú
1998  Clube Atlético Cairu
1999  CE Mauá
2000  AA Guarú
2001  AA Guarú
2002  AA Guarú
2003  CE Mauá
2004  CE Mauá
2005  AA Guarú
2006  Metodista São Bernardo
2007  Metodista São Bernardo
2008  Metodista São Bernardo
2009  Metodista São Bernardo
2010  Metodista São Bernardo
2011  Metodista São Bernardo
2012  Metodista São Bernardo
2013  UnC Concórdia
2014  Metodista São Bernardo
2015  Metodista São Bernardo
2016  EC Pinheiros
2017  UnC Concórdia
2018  UnC Concórdia
2019  EC Pinheiros

References

External links
 Official website
 Handball Brazil

Handball in Brazil
Pan-American Team Handball Federation
Handball